Vivienne Robertson (born 18 June 1955) is a former association football player who represented New Zealand at international level.

Robertson made her Football Ferns debut in a 2–1 loss to  Australia on 4 October 1981 and ended her international career with 36 caps and 8 goals to her credit.

Robertson was in the New Zealand squad for the Women's World Cup finals in China in 1991, but did not take the field at the finals tournament.

References

External links

1955 births
Living people
New Zealand women's international footballers
New Zealand women's association footballers
1991 FIFA Women's World Cup players
Women's association football defenders